Neotaracia imox is a species of tephritid or fruit flies in the genus Neotaracia of the family Tephritidae.

Distribution
Mexico, South to Colombia & Ecuador, East to Venezuela & Trinidad.

References

Tephritinae
Insects described in 1934
Diptera of South America